Joseph Heath (born 4 October 1988) is an English footballer who plays for Vauxhall Motors. A defender, Heath plays primarily as a left back.

Despite being a Vauxhall Motors FC fan, Heath was signed by Manchester United as a schoolboy. After being released by United, he signed for Nottingham Forest.

Heath made his full first team debut in August 2008 in a 4–0 League Cup win against Morecambe. He made his Championship debut in a 2–1 defeat to Burnley at the City Ground. In total, Heath made 12 first team appearances during the 2008–2009 season.

On 26 June 2009, Heath signed for Lincoln City on an initial six-month loan deal. However, the need for a hernia operation restricted Heath to just five league and cup appearances for the club before he returned to the City Ground on the completion of his loan. On 19 January 2010 he agreed to leave Forest by mutual consent. On 8 February 2010, along with James Reid, he began a one-week trial with Exeter City. In November 2010 Heath joined Hereford United on-loan initially for a month but this was later extended until the end of the season. He signed a 2-year deal to stay at Hereford in June 2011 following his release from Exeter City. In the summer of 2013, Heath joined Chester. He spend the 2014–15 season with West Kirby of the West Cheshire Association Football League, scoring as the club secured the Cheshire FA Amateur Cup with a 4–3 victory over Rudheuth Social on 10 April 2015.

Heath then signed for Runcorn Town.

He later joined Welsh Premier League side Connah's Quay Nomads and signed with the club as a full-time professional.

He then joined Vauxhall Motors, where as well as playing, he helps out with the coaching.

References

External links
 
 Joe Heath Profile at The Forgotten Imp
 

1988 births
Living people
Sportspeople from Birkenhead
English footballers
Association football defenders
Nottingham Forest F.C. players
Lincoln City F.C. players
Exeter City F.C. players
Hereford United F.C. players
Chester F.C. players
English Football League players
National League (English football) players
Connah's Quay Nomads F.C. players
Runcorn Town F.C. players
Cymru Premier players
Vauxhall Motors F.C. players